The Dominican Summer League Rockies or DSL Rockies are a Rookie League affiliate of the Colorado Rockies based in the Dominican Republic. They play in the Dominican Summer League. As an independent affiliate, they have been in existence since 1997.  Starting in 2018, two squads were fielded, initially known as DSL Rockies 1 and DSL Rockies 2. In 2021, the two teams were named DSL Colorado and DSL Rockies.

History
The team first came into existence in 1992, the year before the MLB debut of the Colorado Rockies.  They shared an affiliation with the Kansas City Royals and the Chicago Cubs and were known as the DSL Royals/Cubs/Rockies.  The team continued to share an affiliation with the Royals from 1993 to 1996, when it was known as the DSL Royals/Rockies.  The team has been independently affiliated with the Rockies since 1997.  Beginning in 2018, the DSL Rockies will split into two squads, competing as DSL Rockies 1 and DSL Rockies 2.  Long-time manager Mauricio Gonzalez will coach Team 1, and Julio Campos will manage Team 2.

Roster

References

Baseball teams established in 1997
Colorado Rockies minor league affiliates
Dominican Summer League teams
Baseball teams in the Dominican Republic
1997 establishments in the Dominican Republic